Marie Louise Inger Wennersten From (born 17 March 1958) is a retired Swedish professional golfer who played on the Ladies European Tour and LPGA Tour.

Early life and amateur career
Wennersten was born in Uddevalla on the west-coast of Sweden and played golf from age 10.  As an amateur, representing Lyckorna Golf Club in Ljungskile south of Uddevalla, she won the Swedish Junior Match-play Championship in 1977 and the Swedish Match-play Championship in 1981, successfully defending the title in 1982. She represented Sweden at the European Lady Junior's Team Championship four times and was part of the Swedish team winning the 1978 event.

Professional career
In 1984, Wennersten enjoyed a spell on the LPGA Tour, with a best finish of T38 at the MasterCard International Pro-Am. The following year she became the second Swedish golfer to win on the Ladies European Tour, after Kärstin Ehrnlund, when she won the Mitsubishi Colt Cars Jersey Open. She returned to Jersey two years later to win the Hong Kong Bank Jersey Classic, a non-tour event. She finished third at the 1985 British Women's Open at Moor Park Golf Club, 4 strokes behind Betsy King, and ended the season ranked 10th on the LET Order of Merit.

Wennersten won the Swedish Golf Tour Order of Merit in 1990 and 1991. She retired from tour in 1992 to become a PGA Club Professional, and has served as head pro at Örkelljunga Golfklubb, Lunds Akademiska Golfklubb and Örestads Golfklubb.

Amateur wins
1977 Swedish Junior Match-play Championship
1981 Swedish Match-play Championship
1982 Swedish Match-play Championship

Professional wins (8)

Ladies European Tour wins (1)

Swedish Golf Tour wins (6)
1987 (2) Höganäs Ladies Open, Aspeboda Ladies Open
1988 (2) Kanthal Höganäs Open, Aspeboda Ladies Open
1989 (1) Aspeboda Ladies Open
1991 (1) Grundig Team Trophy

Other wins (1)

Team appearances
Amateur
European Lady Junior's Team Championship (representing Sweden): 1975, 1977, 1978 (winners), 1979

References

External links

Swedish female golfers
Ladies European Tour golfers
LPGA Tour golfers
People from Uddevalla Municipality
Sportspeople from Lund
1958 births
Living people